Postman Pat: The Movie is a 2014 3D computer animated comedy film based on the television series Postman Pat by John Cunliffe and Ivor Wood. It was directed by Mike Disa, produced by Robert Anich Cole, written and screenplay by Nicole Dubuc, with music by Rupert Gregson-Williams. It was co-produced by Classic Media (which at the time was already owned by DreamWorks Animation), RGH Pictures and Timeless Films.

The film stars Stephen Mangan, Jim Broadbent, Rupert Grint, David Tennant, Ronan Keating, Susan Duerden, Sandra Teles, TJ Ramini and Peter Woodward. It was released in the UK on 23 May 2014 by Lionsgate UK and Icon Film Distribution respectively. The film received mixed to positive reviews from critics and grossed $8,660,022 worldwide.

Plot 
Patrick "Pat" Clifton, also known as "Postman Pat" (Stephen Mangan), is a friendly postman who has been delivering letters in the village of Greendale in the north of England for years. He is planning to take his wife, Sara (Susan Duerden), on a late honeymoon to Italy. He tries to afford it through a bonus from his employer, the Special Delivery Service (SDS), but their new boss, Edwin Carbunkle (Peter Woodward), has cancelled all bonuses. He plans to make SDS more efficient by replacing its human workers with robots, thinking that being friendly is a waste of time.

When Pat gets home and tries to tell Sara about the fact that the honeymoon is cancelled because the new boss has cancelled all bonuses, his son Julian (Sandra Teles) shows Pat a television talent show, You're the One, hosted by Simon Cowbell (Robin Atkin Downes in a typical Simon Cowell voice), who states the next auditions are coming to Greendale. Cowbell also confirms that the person who wins the contest will be awarded a holiday to Italy and a recording contract.

Pat decides to take part in the contest and his unexpected singing voice (Ronan Keating) wins the contest. Pat is to sing again in the finale, in a head-to-head contest with the winner of another heat, Josh (Rupert Grint). His Scottish-accented manager, Wilf (David Tennant), however, is very keen to make sure it is his client who wins at all costs.

The Chief Executive Officer of the SDS, Mr Brown (Jim Broadbent), and Edwin Carbunkle had been watching the contest on television. They say that they would like to use Pat in a publicity campaign including his own television series. Carbunkle also confirms that because Pat will be away participating in the contest, a robot replica of him called the "Patbot 3000" will be taking over his postal duties, along with another robot replica of Jess called the "Jessbot" as well.

After Pat and Jess are gone, the Patbot delivers the rounds like Pat normally does, but it behaves oddly and the people of Greendale are starting to complain about Pat behaving in such a way. Sara and Julian are starting to worry about Pat too. Meanwhile, Ben Taylor (TJ Ramini), the manager at the SDS, is fired by Carbunkle and is convinced that Pat doesn't want him anymore, not realising that Pat is a robot. Meanwhile, Wilf tries his schemes to stop Pat, not realising that the "Pat" going around Greendale is in fact a robot but they all backfire. The more Pat's family and friends become concerned, the more Pat feels guilty about coming on the contest in the first place.

And despite Pat's efforts to tell his wife the truth about why he entered the competition, he fails and starts to become fearful that he might have pushed his family away. It isn't until shortly after Pat's departure for the final competition that Ben and Jess discover that there appears to be more than one Pat and Edwin Carbunkle's true intent is exposed. It turns out that Carbunkle is in fact an evil megalomaniac and is making these robots to try and take over the world. Ben then rushes to tell Sara and Julian the terrible truth about Mr Carbunkle's plan.

Now fully aware of Carbunkle's plan, a desperate Sara informs the whole of Greendale about Carbunkle's true intentions and explaining that deep down, Pat has not changed. They all agree to head to London to support Pat, in an effort to thwart Carbunkle's plan. Meanwhile, Jess, who has stowed away on one of the SDS helicopter replicas that one of the Patbot 3000s used, manages to make his way to where Pat's performance, and he helps Pat escape after he is locked away in a dressing room by a Patbot and Carbunkle, who reveals that Pat's publicity was just to make people like him, so Mr Carbunkle could replace him with Patbots. They are then pursued by the Patbots and the Jessbot but manages to outsmart them all and get inside the theater.

Meanwhile, in the performance, a Patbot performs instead of Pat, unbeknownst to the audience. Wilf arrives, knowing it to be a robot (after defeating a Patbot with a magnet at the sorting officer earlier), uses a magnet to unmask the Patbot. Then, the real Pat interrupts the performance and gives a speech on what's really important and how he forgot to take time for those he really cares about. As Carbunkle releases the first few Patbots to kill off Pat, Simon and Brown, revealing that he has had enough of them hindering his plans, Josh saves them by using Carbunkle's phone to turn off all the Patbots before they can kill Pat, Cowbell and Brown. Little does Pat know that his wife and friends from Greendale arrive in the chaos.

After Brown fires Carbunkle and has him arrested, everything is back to normal. Unaware that Sara is listening, Pat expresses that he is only doing this competition to win the flight tickets for their honeymoon. Sara is suddenly heard calling Pat's name. Once Pat catches sight of Sara, Julian and all the people of Greendale in the audience, it dawns on him that Sara has heard the truth about why he entered the competition and is fully aware of Carbunkle's plan. Now fully aware that Sara has forgiven him. Pat decides to do his act but decides to change the act slightly. In the end, Pat sings Stevie Wonder’s Signed, Sealed, Delivered I'm Yours with Brown, Josh, Wilf and the people of Greendale joining in. Sara also takes part in the act. They both win the holiday to Italy but pass the recording contract to Josh, so Wilf is happy too, and all is forgiven.

Cast

Release

Theatrical release 
It was originally due to be released on 24 May 2013, but was pushed back to 23 May 2014, one year after the show's ending. In the United Kingdom, it was theatrically released by Lionsgate and Icon Film Distribution jointly. In the United States, it entered a limited theatrical release from Shout! Factory and was released on DVD by Paramount Home Media Distribution on September 23, 2014.

Home media 
Postman Pat: The Movie was released in the United Kingdom on DVD and Blu-ray on 29 September 2014, by Lionsgate Home Entertainment.

Reception

Critical response 
The film received mixed reviews from critics. Some of which praised the film for the animation, the direction, the humor, and the voice acting, while others found it too complicated and frightening in comparison to the television series. Another review aggregator, Metacritic, calculated a score of 44 out of 100, based on nine reviews, indicating "mixed or average reviews".

Patrick Smith, writing for The Daily Telegraph, gave the film two stars, commenting "where the TV series was charming in its simplicity, this seems over-egged". Andrew Pulver of The Guardian gave it two stars, calling it "a misjudgment, a serious overestimation of the development of the four-year-old's irony circuit".

In The Observer, Mark Kermode gave it the same rating, criticising "bland digimation" and lack of the "charm" of the television series, and saying that the film had "little to entice the over-sixes and plenty to scare the under-fives". In the Daily Mirror, David Edwards gave the film two stars, writing "Boasting spectacularly shoddy animation and gags that wouldn’t amuse a dim-witted five-year-old, this is one to be thrown out with the junk mail".

Allan Hunter of the Daily Express gave it three stars, and said "Kids are going to love Postman Pat: The Movie even if adults might find it sacrilegious in its treatment of their beloved childhood favourite... It's a bit Wallace & Gromit, a bit Doctor Who and just as silly and overexcited as a four-year-old after an excess of fizzy drinks."

The Los Angeles Times Gary Goldstein wrote "First-class Postman Pat delivers in fine style". The Mareel review written by Caroline Malcolm wrote "Postman Pat: The Movie, was a surprise from start to finish...Mike Disa, who is known for his children's animations showed off his artistic style by yet again creating a movie that captivated children with CGI pleasures, but also enticed adults with intensely intelligent sociobites disguised as entertainment."

Box office 
Postman Pat: The Movie grossed £774,450 in its opening weekend, ranking #4 in the box office in the United Kingdom led by X-Men: Days of Future Past with £9,144,971. The film grossed $5,515,679 in the United Kingdom and a total of $8,660,022 globally, Making it the Eleventh Highest-grossing film of 2014.

Accolades 
Postman Pat: The Movies production groups, Timeless Films and Zealot Productions, were nominated for Best Foreign Animation/Family Trailer at the Golden Trailer Awards in 2014.

Awards

See also 
 Guess with Jess

References

External links 

 

2014 computer-animated films
2014 films
2010s children's animated films
2010s science fiction comedy films
2010s children's comedy films
Animated films based on animated television series
British computer-animated films
British children's animated films
British animated science fiction films
British children's comedy films
British robot films
American computer-animated films
American robot films
American animated comedy films
Films about businesspeople
Films about singers
Cultural depictions of presenters
Films scored by Rupert Gregson-Williams
Films directed by Mike Disa
Lionsgate films
Animated films about cats
Icon Productions films
Films set in London
2014 comedy films
2010s English-language films
2010s British films
2010s American films